The Slavonic Corps is a Hong Kong-registered private military contractor that operated during the Syrian civil war.

Formation
According to media reports, the Slavonic Corps was registered in Hong Kong by two employees of the private security company Moran Security Group, Russian nationals Vadim Gusev and Yevgeniy Sidorov.

In the spring of 2013, job ads by a Hong Kong-based company emerged on various Russian military related websites. The ads promised 5,000 USD per month for guard duties protecting Syrian energy facilities during the Syrian civil war. The ads attracted the attention of former members of OMON, SOBR, VDV and Spetsnaz; many of them had previous military experience in the Tajikistani Civil War as well as the Second Chechen War.

Deployment
In 2013, after initially arriving in Beirut, Lebanon, the PMCs were first transferred to Damascus, Syria and then to a Syrian army base in Latakia. By October, the Slavonic Corps had a strength of 267 contractors divided into two companies that were present in Latakia.

The contractors were provided with outdated equipment which raised concerns among the participants. They soon realized that the FSB and the Syrian government had no involvement with the operation. Those wishing to return to Russia were left with no choice but to earn their ticket back through direct participation in the Syrian civil war. The new goal of the Slavonic Corps was described as guarding the oil fields of Deir ez-Zor. Instead of the promised T-72s, the contractors were provided with buses covered in metal plates. En route to Deir ez-Zor, the column encountered a Syrian air force helicopter which collided with a transmission line and crashed into the caravan, injuring one of the contractors.

On 18 October, the column received orders to reinforce Syrian army forces in the city of Al-Sukhnah. Three hours into its journey, the column came under attack. With the aid of a Syrian army self-propelled gun and air support from a single fighter jet, the contractors assumed a defensive position. Jaysh al-Islam fighters numbering from two to six thousand men (according to the Russians) attempted a pincer movement. Vastly outnumbered, the contractors retreated to their vehicles as a desert storm covered the battlefield. In the aftermath of the battle, six Slavonic Corps members were wounded. Having failed to achieve their objectives, the group returned to Russia. 

Upon arriving at Vnukovo International Airport, the participants were detained by the FSB on suspicion of acting as mercenaries, which is punishable under Article 359 of the Russian criminal law. Despite the fact that the company was registered in Hong Kong, the owners, Gusev and Sidorov, were also charged and convicted in October 2014.

References

Private military contractors
Pro-government factions of the Syrian civil war
Mercenary units and formations
Military units and formations established in 2013
Military corporations
Russian companies established in 2013
Russian nationalist organizations